This is a list of colleges and universities in Rohtak, Haryana, India:

 All India Jat Heroes' Memorial College
 Indian Institute of Management Rohtak (IIM Rohtak)
 Haryana Technical Institute Near New Bus Stand, Rohtak
 Maa Saraswati Institute of Engineering & Technology, Kalanaur, Rohtak
 Maharishi Dayanand University
 Neki Ram Sharma Government College
 State Institute of Film and Television
 Jat Education Society Rohtak
 Government College for Women (IC College)

References 

Education in Rohtak
Rohtak
Haryana-related lists